This is a list of listed buildings in Tønder Municipality, Denmark.

The list

6240 Løgumkloster

6261 Bredebro

6270 Tønder
This list is incomplete

6280 Højer
This list is incomplete

6534 Agerskov

6792 Rømø

References

External links

 Danish Agency of Culture

 
Tønder